Hubert Gad, also known as Hubert God (15 August 1914 – 3 July 1939), was a Polish football player, a very skilled and aggressive forward, who for a while was the top scorer of Poland.

Born in Świętochłowice, Gad represented both Śląsk Świętochłowice and Poland. In white-red jersey debuted 16 February 1936 at Heysel Stadium in Brussels. His debut was excellent, as Gad scored a goal and Poland won 2-0.

During the 1936 Summer Olympic Games in Berlin, he was a key player on the team. Gad, who was regarded as a temporary replacement for Ernest Wilimowski, proved his excellent quality, scoring 4 goals in the tournament. After the Olympics, represented Poland in additional 4 games, scoring once.

Gad died in 1939 while swimming in a lake. His funeral took place on 9 July 1939, and among pallbearers there were such renowned soccer players as Leonard Piątek, Ryszard Piec, Ewald Dytko and Teodor Peterek.

References

1914 births
1939 deaths
Polish footballers
Poland international footballers
Olympic footballers of Poland
Footballers at the 1936 Summer Olympics
Śląsk Świętochłowice players
People from Świętochłowice
People from the Province of Silesia
Sportspeople from Silesian Voivodeship
Association football forwards
Deaths by drowning